The Rude Boys is a 1990s R&B/vocal group from Cleveland, Ohio. The group consisted of Larry Marcus, Melvin Sephus, and brothers Edward Lee "Buddy" Banks and Joe Little III. Marcus later died in October 2016. Banks died in December 2020.

Discography

Studio albums
Rude Awakening (1990)
Rude House (1992)
Rude as Ever (1997)

Singles

Awards and nominations
1991 Billboard Music Award won for The Rude Boys No. 1 R&B Single of the Year ("Written All Over Your Face").

References

African-American musical groups
American vocal groups
American rhythm and blues musical groups
New jack swing music groups
Musical groups from Cleveland
Atlantic Records artists
Vocal quartets